Grete Pavlousek (born 7 October 1923) is an Austrian sprinter. She competed in the women's 100 metres at the 1948 Summer Olympics.

References

External links
 

1923 births
Possibly living people
Athletes (track and field) at the 1948 Summer Olympics
Austrian female sprinters
Olympic athletes of Austria
Place of birth missing
Olympic female sprinters